Mourad Benachenou was the Algerian minister for the restructure of industry in the 1995 government of Mokdad Sifi.

References

Living people
Year of birth missing (living people)
Place of birth missing (living people)
20th-century Algerian politicians
Industry ministers of Algeria